Asterinema is a genus of fungi in the Microthyriaceae family.

Species; as accepted by Species Fungorum;
 Asterinema caseariae 
 Asterinema philippinense 
 
Former species;
 A. caseariae var. amazonense  = Asterinema caseariae 
 A. jahnii  = Calothyrium jahnii, Microthyriaceae

References

External links
Index Fungorum

Microthyriales